"Paper in Fire" is a song by American rock singer John Mellencamp, released on August 15, 1987 as the first single from his ninth studio album The Lonesome Jubilee.

The song was a commercial success, reaching number 9 on the Billboard Hot 100 chart. It also topped the Billboard Mainstream Rock Tracks chart and the Canadian Singles Chart, and charted on various European singles charts.

Mellencamp biographer David Masciotra called it a "ferocious song" that is the "aural equivalent of a wild beast breaking out of its cage."
  Masciotra describes it as having a libertarian theme. Mellencamp has said that the song is about his uncle Joe Mellencamp, who could be cruel to others and his own worst enemy, saying that "'Paper in Fire' is about Joe, and the family's ingrained anger...It is tragic when families don't grow up."

Cash Box said that "AOR will undoubtedly benefit from this one - as will Top 40 radio, music video saturation is guaranteed."

Track listing
7" single
 "Paper in Fire" – 3:53
 "Never Too Old" – 3:45

CDV single
 "Paper in Fire" – 3:48
 "Never Too Old" – 3:43
 "Under the Boardwalk" – 3:51
 "Cold Sweat" – 3:23
 "Paper in Fire" (video) – 3:57

Charts

Weekly charts

Year-end charts

References

1987 singles
John Mellencamp songs
Songs written by John Mellencamp
1987 songs
Mercury Records singles
Song recordings produced by Don Gehman